Epitaphios or epitaphius may refer to:

 Epitaphios (liturgical) or epitaphion, a cloth icon used during Holy Week in churches that follow the Byzantine rite
 Funeral oration (ancient Greece) or epitaphios logos
 Gorgias' text on the same

See also
 Epitafios, an Argentine TV series